Luke Evans (born 26 April 1987) is an English professional first-class cricketer who played for Durham and Northamptonshire. He is primarily a right-arm fast medium bowler.

Measuring at a giant 6'10", Evans is a product of the Durham academy, whom he went on to make his first-class debut for in 2007 against a Sri Lanka A side. He first joined Northamptonshire on a 1-month loan on 15 April 2010, but stayed at the county for only 16 days before being recalled. At the end of the 2010 season Evans was released and was immediately snapped up by David Capel at Northants.

Evans's Northants career had been blighted by injuries, but he returned at the end of the 2012 season gaining 12 wickets in total against Gloucestershire and Hampshire, this prompted coach David Ripley to offer him a new one-year contract. He was unable to break into the first team the following season, and was released by Northants. Since then, he has played club cricket for Kibworth, in the Leicestershire and Rutland Cricket League.

Career best performances
as of 24 December 2012

References

External links
 

1987 births
English cricketers of the 21st century
English cricketers
Living people
Durham cricketers
Northamptonshire cricketers
Cricketers from Sunderland
Bedfordshire cricketers